Hopewell Township is one of the fourteen townships of Mercer County, Ohio, United States.  The 2000 census found 1,066 people in the township.

Geography
Located in the north central part of the county, it borders the following townships:
Dublin Township - north
Union Township - northeast corner
Center Township - east
Jefferson Township - south
Liberty Township - west
Black Creek Township - northwest corner

No municipalities are located in Hopewell Township.

Name and history
Hopewell Township was organized in 1842. It is one of five Hopewell Townships statewide.

Government
The township is governed by a three-member board of trustees, who are elected in November of odd-numbered years to a four-year term beginning on the following January 1. Two are elected in the year after the presidential election and one is elected in the year before it. There is also an elected township fiscal officer, who serves a four-year term beginning on April 1 of the year after the election, which is held in November of the year before the presidential election. Vacancies in the fiscal officership or on the board of trustees are filled by the remaining trustees.

References

External links
County website

Townships in Mercer County, Ohio
Townships in Ohio